Shark in Venice (known as Sharks in Venice in the United States) is a 2008 American natural-horror film directed by Danny Lerner and starring Stephen Baldwin, Giacomo Gonnella and Vanessa Johansson.

Plot
The film takes place in Venice, where David Franks (Stephen Baldwin) and his girlfriend Laura (Vanessa Johansson) are meeting with Venetian police to learn more about the mysterious disappearance of David's father. During the boat ride to where they think David's father may have last been seen, David sees the dorsal fin of a large shark. In a double-take he looks back and the fin is gone. David and another man, Rossi, enter the canals wearing wetsuits and scuba gear. A large shark preys on the two and in a sudden attack the Italian man is eaten. David is bitten in the shoulder but manages to escape to a cave.

In the cave, David narrowly escapes several close calls with contraptions. He then emerges in a large room in the cave which holds vast amounts of treasure. David stares in wonder at it, pockets a gold and emerald brooch and returns to Laura in the boat. The next scene shows him recuperating in a hospital bed with Laura by his side.

David and Laura are asked to meet and have dinner with business-man Vito Clemenza (Giacomo Gonnella). Clemenza produces the brooch David had taken from the treasure room and asks David to return to the cave. As unsuspecting tourists are devoured, David contemplates his next move. Before too long Laura is kidnapped by Clemenza's Mafia goons. David decides to try to save her with the help of the Venetian police. Ultimately, David defeats the Mafia, saves Laura and finds the treasure, which his father had died searching for. Clemenza is killed by one of the sharks when he falls in the water while fighting David.

It is unclear whether it is a scientific phenomenon leading to the gradual increase in the temperature of the Grand Canal and the presence of at least one Great white shark taking up residence in the city of Venice. Later in the film Clemenza appears to tell David that he is the one who has introduced the sharks to the waterways.

Cast
 Stephen Baldwin as David Franks
 Vanessa Johansson as Laura
 Hilda van der Meulen as Lieutenant Sofia Totti
 Giacomo Gonnella as Vito Clemenza
 Ivaylo Geraskov as Rossi
 Atanas Srebrev as Captain Fredo Bonasera
 Kaloyan Vondenicharov as Man In Black
 Bashar Rahal as Medical Examiner
 Vladimir Kolev as Assistant
 Michael McCoy as Dean Flathers
 Asen Blatechki as Operator
 Rolando Cadenas as Jennings
 Ivo Kehayov as Cop
 Dejan Angelov Henchman
 Jamie Smith as Statue #1
 Howard Chen as Bison
 Rob Gibson as Sunburnt Man #2
 Tom Bergeron as Dan "Banana Man Dan"

Production
The film was shot on location in Bulgaria. In fact, the director intended to name the film Shark in Bulgaria, but it would not have had the same "flow" as if the film were titled Shark in Venice.

Release
The film was released on December 14, 2008 in the United States, and on August 6, 2009 on DVD as Der weiße Hai von Venedig in Germany. It has received negative reviews, holding a score of 14% on review aggregator website Rotten Tomatoes, based on 454 user reviews and one critic review. An online reviewer on the website Bananas About Movies wrote that it is "a bad film, poorly made. But just bad enough to be worth watching. At least once. Then strike it from your mind".

See also
 List of killer shark films

References

External links 
 
 

2008 direct-to-video films
2008 films
Films about sharks
Films set in Venice
Films shot in Bulgaria
2000s Italian-language films
American natural horror films
Films about shark attacks
Nu Image films
Italian-language American films
2000s English-language films
Films directed by Danny Lerner
2000s American films